Ramu (20 June 1968 – 26 April 2021) was an Indian film producer and distributor known for his work in Kannada cinema. Some of the films produced by Ramu are AK 47 (1999), Lockup Death (1994), Kalasipalya (2004), Ganga (2015) Sagar(2012). He died from COVID-19 related complications.

Career
Ramu produced more than 30 films from his production and distribution company Ramu Enterprises.

Filmography

See also

List of people from Karnataka
Cinema of Karnataka
List of film producers
Cinema of India

References

External links
 
 Biography of Film producer Ramu on Chiloka.com
 Biography of Film producer Ramu on Filmibeat.com
 Biography of Film producer Ramu on Sify Movies

1968 births
2021 deaths
Film producers from Karnataka
Kannada film producers
Deaths from the COVID-19 pandemic in India